Jack O'Lantern is an alias used by several supervillains appearing in American comic books published by Marvel Comics.

Publication history

Jason Macendale first appeared as Jack O'Lantern in Machine Man #19 (February 1981).

The Steven Mark Levins version of Jack O'Lantern first appeared in Captain America #396 (January 1992).

The third version of Jack O'Lantern first appeared in The Spectacular Spider-Man #241 (December 1996).

The fourth version of Jack O'Lantern first appeared in Dark Reign: Made Men #1 (November 2009).

The fifth version of Jack O'Lantern first appeared in Venom vol. 2 #1 (2011).

Fictional character biography

Jason Macendale

Jason Macendale was a mercenary who was recruited out of college and trained by the CIA and various para-military organizations. Considered a liability due to his violent nature and amoral personality, this rejection turned Macendale to a career mercenary and ultimately a costumed terrorist. He adopted the Jack O'Lantern alter ego, engaging in combat with Machine Man as his first opponent followed by Spider-Man for the first time.

Macendale was later hired to retrieve the Hobgoblin's lost battle van, pulling off the mission successfully despite Spider-Man's untimely appearance. When Flash Thompson insulted the Hobgoblin on national television which had incurred the Hobgoblin's wrath to frame Thompson so that criminal enemies might target Flash instead, Macendale subsequently broke Thompson out of jail, thinking he was doing the Hobgoblin a favor. But Macendale ruined the Hobgoblin's plans to operate "under the radar" while Thompson was in custody. When the Kingpin temporarily abdicated being the organized crime's head on the eastern seaboard and a resulting gang war tore New York City apart, Macendale wished to increase his underworld status and formed an alliance with the Hobgoblin. The Hobgoblin ultimately double-crossed Macendale when the two were fleeing a horde of police officers. Macendale vowed revenge, ultimately hiring the Foreigner to have the Hobgoblin killed. After his co-conspirator's supposed death, all known copies of Goblin weapons and costumes were handed over to Macendale who took over the Hobgoblin identity in order to steal notoriety within the supervillain community. However, Macendale was exposed by the Kingpin's organization and fought a battle against Spider-Man which was meant to prove his abilities but was foiled. To add to the embarrassment, Spider-Man was obviously drunk when they fought and still won.

Deciding he needed abilities like the original Green Goblin and Hobgoblin if he was to have a similar reputation, Macendale attempted to steal the Goblin secret formula for superhuman strength. After failing to do so, he intimated Harry Osborn by threatening Osborn's loved ones for wanting the Goblin formula, resulting in a confrontation between himself and the second Green Goblin where Macendale was overcame. During a demonic invasion of Manhattan, Macendale felt dejected and humiliated. Offering to sell his soul in exchange for a demon's power, the demon N'astirh fused a demon to Macendale. Enhanced by the demon's power but horrified as his handsome face transformed into a demonic one, Macendale blamed his suffering on Spider-Man and Osborn. He hunted Spider-Man down for revenge. With his demonic powers, Macendale defeated Spider-Man easily but Mary Jane Watson intervened before he could deliver the killing blow.

Having finally been made into the notorious supervillain he hoped to be at the cost of his humanity, Macendale put his personal enmity for Spider-Man aside and used his demonic powers to be a top contract killer. He offered his mercenary services to Hammerhead and Tombstone to eliminate Robbie Robertson but is stopped by Spider-Man and Puma. Macendale next conspired with Carrion to eliminate Spider-Man before his co-conspirator ultimately nearly took both villains out instead. Macendale goes after Doctor Strange but an illusion spell is cast to try to calm the monstrous man/demon and Macendale sees his true face in reflections of himself. Macendale was later stiff-armed by Doctor Octopus into joining the Sinister Six's second incarnation which twice tried to take over the world, failing due to counter measures by Spider-Man, Hulk, Ghost Rider, the Fantastic Four and many more heroes.

As an independent mercenary and criminal, Macendale would clash with many other heroes, including Darkhawk, and Sleepwalker. However, the insane demon who shared his body acts dominate but gets destabilized long enough for Macendale to briefly regain his sanity during conflicts with Spider-Man and other heroes; once involving Moon Knight, and twice involving the two Ghost Riders (Danny Ketch and Johnny Blaze). Macendale ultimately expelled the demon referred to as the Demogoblin out of his body. Despite Richard Fisk want vengeance for Ned Leeds, he has a reluctant partnership with Fisk but later tried to eliminate the Blood Rose and the new Kingpin but is foiled by Spider-Man. In a rare event, Macendale teamed up with Spider-Man to defeat the duo of Demogoblin and Doppelganger. Macendale was hired by the Foreigner to assassinate Moon Knight and Nick Katzenberg only to be stopped by Moon Knight and Spider-Man, and turned over to the authorities. Macendale obtained Kraven the Hunter's strength formula, which enabled him to easily defeat his demonic doppelganger Demogoblin who then died saving a young child in battle.

Macendale was defeated once more by Spider-Man along with Coldheart during an attempt to kidnap Macendale's long-lost son. However, Macendale's reunion would be an unhappy one as Macendale attempted (unsuccessfully) to use his son as a hostage to avoid going back to jail. He would remain in jail for some time before being freed by Gaunt, combating against the second Spider-Man. In exchange for doing Gaunt's bidding, the scientist turned Macendale into a cyborg such as the removal of Macendale's left eye with a new high-tech cybernetic eye. He failed and was once again arrested.

Considered "just a criminal" by Spider-Man, Macendale was viewed as a typical (sociopathic) thug who is not much of a threat as his predecessor and Norman Osborn in comparison.

Macendale went on trial for his many crimes and found guilty on several counts (including convictions for the original Hobgoblin's acts), disgustingly responding by revealing that Leeds was his predecessor. His continued testimony leads Spider-Man recounting encounters with the original Hobgoblin, and thus realized that Ned cannot possibly be the supervillain due to lack of powers (despite being killed when Macendale paid the Foreigner). Despite Macendale being in prison, Roderick Kingsley broke into prison, taunting him as an unworthy successor and murdered Macendale.

A later version of Jack O'Lantern is captured by S.H.I.E.L.D.; this individual used several false aliases including Jason Macendale, Maguire Beck (Mysterio's cousin), and Mad Jack (Daniel Berkhart). Jack O'Lantern's true identity was never revealed but it was not any of the aliases he was using.

Steven Mark Levins

The second version of Jack O'Lantern was introduced as an enemy of Captain America and Spider-Man.

This version of the character was subjected to much controversy, due to the fact that several years after his introduction he was rebranded "Mad Jack" and was heavily featured in the pages of The Spectacular Spider-Man during the late 1990s. Mad Jack was ultimately revealed to be the duo of Daniel Berkhart (ex-Mysterio) and Maguire Beck (Mysterio's cousin). It was not until the one-shot New Avengers Most Wanted (a character compendium) that the second iteration was confirmed as a separate entity: Steven Mark Levins. However, the character's name would not be used in-story until Ghost Rider vol. 5 #10 (2007).

This incarnation was a professional criminal, and a partner of Blackwing. Alongside Blackwing, he searched Skullhouse and first battled Captain America. With Blackwing, he was then admitted as a provisional member of the loosely knit band of the Red Skull's operatives called the Skeleton Crew.

Soon after that, Jack O'Lantern fought Crossbones and Diamondback, and captured Diamondback. Diamondback tried to escape, and Jack O'Lantern fought Diamondback in mid-air. He was ultimately defeated in combat by the Falcon, and taken to the Vault.

He also worked as an enforcer of the Golem and in this capacity, fought the Hood when he interfered in Golem's machinations.

Jack O'Lantern later fought Union Jack alongside Shockwave and Jackhammer to attack the Thames Tunnel.

Following his defeat, Levins was recruited to serve as part of the Thunderbolts hero-hunting squad during the "Civil War" storyline. While pursuing Spider-Man through the Manhattan sewers alongside the Jester, Levins was killed when the Punisher shot Levins in the head, killing him instantly. However, death would not be the end of Levins's story. His headless corpse was reanimated and possessed by a fragment of Lucifer's soul. He now exhibits the ability to detach, levitate and explode his head (now replaced with a real life pumpkin) among other powers. However, the Ghost Rider was able to exorcise him by ripping his heart from his chest, setting it aflame and putting it back in his chest, causing it to explode inside.

During the "Dark Reign" storyline, Levins was among the dead characters seen in Erebus by Hercules. He was later seen on Pluto's jury (alongside Abomination, Armless Tiger Man, Artume, Heinrich Zemo, Commander Kraken, Iron Monger, Kyknos, Nessus, Orka, Scourge of the Underworld, and Veranke) for Zeus' trial.

During the "Dead No More: The Clone Conspiracy" storyline, Levins's Jack O'Lantern form was among the characters that were cloned by the Jackal. He got involved in a fight with the other cloned villains, causing the Prowler's clone to break it up.

Jack O'Lantern later battled Deadpool after stealing 20 million dollars from the Queen Kathleen gambling ship owned by Tombstone.

Jack O'Lantern later led a similar gang called the Jack O'Lanterns. When four of the Jack O'Lanterns turned out to be sleeper agents working for Finisher and Chameleon, Levins helped to contain the rampage by fighting the Jack O'Lanterns.

During the "Sinister War" storyline, Jack O'Lantern was with Foreigner, Taskmaster, Black Ant, Chance, and Slyde when they are sent by Kindred to attack Spider-Man after Kindred had disrupted their armored car robbery.

Mad Jack

There were two people who assumed the Mad Jack alias while wearing the Jack O'Lantern costume:

 Former Mysterio Daniel Berkhart was approached by Norman Osborn providing a version of the Jack O'Lantern costume, under the "Mad Jack" alias. Under Osborn's orders, Berkhart kidnapped John Jameson and exposed to mind-altering chemicals to be turned into a mind controlled pawn: the super-powered wolf alter-ego persona Man-Wolf. Jameson was then sent to attack J. Jonah Jameson, to terrorize and cow into being subservient towards Osborn's scheme to buy the Daily Bugle. During this time, he also stalked Jameson's wife, Marla, implying that the two had a past relationship that Berkhart sought to rekindle.
 After Berkhart's working relationship with Osborn ended when the Green Goblin participated in a magical ritual that rendered him completely insane, Berkhart was then approached by Maguire Beck, the female cousin of Quentin Beck (the original Mysterio). Maguire convinced Berkhart to re-assume the Mysterio identity following her cousin's suicide and the "Mad Jack" costumed identity was retired. But when the two sought to eliminate Spider-Man, Daredevil, J. Jonah Jameson and several other mutual enemies, the two revived the "Mad Jack" persona, with Maguire using holograms and lifelike robotic versions of Mad Jack and Berkhart himself to serve as proxies for herself while she laid in secret. In the end, Maguire was caught and exposed though due to her usage of Berkhart androids but Daredevil and Spider-Man were left unsure as to whether or not Berkhart was truly involved. However Berkhart did ultimately escape with a Mysterio costume, in the confusion at the end.

In the miniseries Spider-Man/Black Cat: The Evil That Men Do, Francis Klum purchased Mysterio's weapons and gimmick in order to be yet another new Mysterio. The seller, Kingpin, said he had acquired the arsenal "from Jack-O-Lantern".

Brother of Steven Levins

A fourth version of Jack O'Lantern is introduced during the "Dark Reign" storyline, is an unnamed man who claimed to be Steve Levins' brother. He has since been caught by the police after killing the 15 year old daughter of his neighbor and drinking his victim's blood as part of his plot to avenge Steve. This man was shown to be able to transform into a Jack O'Lantern-headed villain using the powers of a mystical demon. Detective Tom and Detective Steve interrogated the man. When asked about the pact with the demon, the man transformed into his Jack O'Lantern form where he is now surrounded by bats. When Detective Tom states that he is getting the electric chair, Jack O'Lantern states that he's just biding his time until his "dark lord" arrives to set him free. He was later released by a lawyer sent by Norman Osborn who claimed that Jack O'Lantern is a material witness to a national security case. The lawyer drives away with Jack O'Lantern as Norman plans to gain his services.

During the "Heroic Age", Steve Rogers knew about Jack O'Lantern, noting that Osborn didn't use Jack O'Lantern and suspects that Jack O'Lantern will continue his crusade to avenge his brother.

Crime Master's Jack O'Lantern

A new version of Jack O'Lantern appears working for the third Crime Master. As a child, the kid that would become Jack O'Lantern had disobeyed his parents and mistreated animals. While going as Jack O'Lantern for Halloween, he came across a house that Crime Master was in. The boy was taken under Crime Master's wing and trained him to be an assassin. It was with this training that the boy had killed his parents.

One of his jobs brings him into conflict with the government operative Venom. During this conflict, Venom threw a live grenade into his mouthpiece and it dislocated his jaw. Even after the explosion, he was still able to run and retreat. Later, Crime Master is able to use contacts to discover Venom's true identity Flash Thompson, and has Jack O'Lantern kidnap Betty Brant (Flash's girlfriend) in exchange for Venom letting Crime Master get a shipment of Antarctic Vibranium. When Venom leaves to rescue Betty, he is distracted by Spider-Man's appearance, which drives the Venom symbiote into an uncontrollable rage. Eventually Betty is rescued at the last second by Spider-Man, with Venom then trying to recapture Crime Master. However, Venom is attacked by Jack O'Lantern who proclaims Flash as his first real nemesis, and desiring revenge for the disfiguring grenade explosion, also mockingly calling out Venom's first name. While it hasn't been confirmed, this depiction claims to have killed every other person to go by the Jack O'Lantern name in an effort to "clean up the brand". Jack O'Lantern is a member of the Crime Master's Savage Six.

Jack O'Lantern in his human guise goes first and targets Betty only to end up fighting Venom. During the fight, Megatak assists Jack O'Lantern and punches Venom's phone before he can make a call to the Avengers for help. Jack O'Lantern targets Jessie Thompson and ends up fighting Venom. Venom grabs Jack O'Lantern's gun and fires on him before Jack O'Lantern spews acid on him, causing Venom to cool down in the fountain.

Jack O'Lantern later goes on a killing spree which escalated on Father's Day. Venom tracked him to a sewer thanks to the hidden trail Jack O'Lantern had left behind for him. There, he discovered that Jack had dug up the corpse of Flash's father and blew up the room. In the fight that ensued, it looked like Jack O'Lantern was going to win until Venom took his father's gun from the holster and shot him. Venom chose not to kill Jack O'Lantern.

Jack O'Lantern was incarcerated at the Raft. He managed to continue his operations using an employee of a storage facility as a replacement who Jack O'Lantern's robots brainwashed.

During the "AXIS" storyline, Jack O'Lantern appears as a member of Magneto's unnamed supervillain group during the fight against the Red Skull's Red Onslaught form. His moral compass was inverted with all of those in Genosha when a spell meant to affect only the Red Skull affected everyone on the island. He later rejoined the (now-inverted) villains to prevent the inverted X-Men from detonating a gene bomb which would've killed everyone on Earth who was not a mutant. When a reinversion spell was cast, Jack O'Lantern was evil once again.

During the "Avengers: Standoff!" storyline, Jack O'Lantern was an inmate of Pleasant Hill, a gated community established by S.H.I.E.L.D.

During the "Secret Empire" storyline, Jack O'Lantern appears as a member of the Army of Evil where they attack Manhattan in retaliation for what happened at Pleasant Hill.

Jack O'Lantern is eventually hunted down for his many crimes by Eddie Brock, and is beaten within an inch of his life. Brock lets him live, although it is implied Brock breaks Jack's spine and leaves him in a critical condition before being teleported away to a parallel universe.

Jack O'Lantern was hospitalized following this, and underwent plastic surgery to restore his face and intensive therapy. Jack O'Lantern was released to civilian life, but grew bored almost immediately and returned to supervillainy. Following Deadpool to Wakanda, Jack O'Lantern battles both Deadpool and Black Panther until Deadpool shot him in the head, killing him.

Imposters
There have been different unnamed imposters of Jack O'Lantern:

 As mentioned above, Crime-Master's Jack O'Lantern brainwashed a factory worker into posing as him. He was among the villains gathered by Lord Ogre to attack Venom. Jack O'Lantern later attacked Flash's neighbor Andrea Benton which ended in her father's death as Flash protected Andrea. When Andrea attacked Jack O'Lantern for what happened to her father, the mask came off and Venom saw that this wasn't Crime-Master's Jack O'Lantern. The factory worker explained that he worked at a storage facility and was hypnotized into being Jack O'Lantern by one of Jack O'Lantern's robots. After Venom prevented Andrea from killing him, the imposter Jack O'Lantern was taken into police custody and slipped into a coma moments later.
 An unnamed petty criminal stumbled upon the Jack O'Lantern equipment and became Jack O'Lantern in order to become a supervillain and an arms dealer. He was supplying weapon to criminals from Norman Osborn's armory which attracted the attention of Venom and the police. The Venom symbiote went berserk and ripped out his left eye. After escaping from Venom, the second Jack O'Lantern imposter was seen at the Bar With No Name where he told his tale to the patrons. The Bar With No Name was later attacked by Venom causing the patrons to flee. During the "War of the Realms" storyline, the second Jack O'Lantern imposter found one of Malekith the Accursed's War Witches having teleported into his apartment following a fight with a Dreamstone-enhanced Eddie Brock. Seeing as they have a mutual enemy in Venom, the War Witch conjures another Dreamstone and gives it to Jack O'Lantern. Jack O'Lantern accepts the offer from the War Witch as he reaches out to touch the Dreamstone.

Powers and abilities
Jason Macendale originally possessed no superhuman powers, but used similar paraphernalia to the Hobgoblin and the Green Goblin; both his Jack O'Lantern and Hobgoblin personas used a rocket-powered glider, pumpkin bombs, and gauntlet blasters. During the time in which a demon was grafted to him, he had superhuman strength, speed, and agility, as well as hellfire powers enabling him to create weapons and gliders at will. It is implied that his demonic abilities allowed him to create organic fibers strong enough to bind a normal person. After acquiring Kraven the Hunter's formula, Macendale had enhanced his strength, speed, stamina, durability, reflexes, and agility to superhuman levels, thanks to anomalies in his blood left over when he and Demogoblin were one, but this formula's effects seemed to have later wore off. His later cybernetically enhanced body thanks to Mendel Stromm further increased his strength, speed, reflexes, durability, and stamina. Macendale had extensive military training in hand-to-hand combat, martial arts, espionage, and knowledge of conventional weaponry. He often used conventional military weapons. When he adopted the Hobgoblin persona, he was able to make improvements to the Goblin glider's maneuverability by utilizing skills he gained from his master's degrees in both mechanical engineering and physics. Macendale was also a sociopath and a sadist, which led to his dishonorable discharge from the military.

Steven Levins modeled his Jack O'Lantern costume and equipment after those created by his predecessor. Levins wore a complete body armor made of metal-mesh covered in multi-segmented Kevlar panels, incorporating a rigid, articulated shell which can resist a 7-pound bazooka anti-tank warhead. He wore a bulletproof helmet with an internal three hour, compressed air supply. The helmet is equipped with a telescopic infrared image-intensifier for seeing in the dark and 360 degree scanning device for seeing all around himself. The base of the helmet is equipped with a fine network of pinholes which maintain a low temperature, low density flame ("stage-fire") that rings the helmet at all times. The air supply cools the helmet's interior. The helmet is padded to protect his head from injury. He also used various types of grenades, including anesthetic, lachrymatory (tear gas), hallucinogenic, and regurgitant gas grenades, smoke grenades, and concussion grenades. The grenades are shaped like spheres or pumpkins. He can fire small grenades from wrist devices. He can also release "ghost-grabbers" which are thick, semi-transparent films which adhere to a victim. Levins rides atop a one-man hovercraft with an electric motor powered by a high density lithium rechargeable battery.

Daniel Berkhart used the same weapons as the previous incarnations of Jack O'Lantern, along with chemical weapons that cause psychedelic and mind-bending hallucinations. His accomplice Maguire Beck was an expert designer of special effects devices and stage illusions, a master hypnotist, and skilled in chemistry and robotics, including a lifelike robotic black cat. Beck has used her advanced knowledge of computer imaging and virtual reality to improve upon Mysterio's techniques, allowing for Beck to pretend to be Mad Jack via proxies while safely hidden in her secret lair.

The brother of Levins can transform into a demon with the head of a jack-o'-lantern using the powers of an unknown mystical demon.

The fifth incarnation, along with the same general weapons the previous ones used, has a fleet of tiny flying cartoon-styled devil robots. Instead of a hovercraft, he rides a jet-powered "broomstick".

Reception
 In 2021, Screen Rant included the Unknown Jack O'Lantern in their "10 Best Marvel Legacy Villains Who Lived Up To Their Predecessor" list.

Other versions

MC2
In the MC2 timeline, Maguire Beck is that Spider-Ham character to lure Spider-Man to the Heartland Entertainment building. Once there, Spider-Man met up with Araña, and together they battled robots created by Jack O'Lantern. Years later, Maguire lured Spider-Girl to the same location. After fighting several Jack O'Lanterns, Spider-Girl finished them off and discovered that Maguire was really a robot.

Earth-Chaos
On the day before Halloween 13 years after the Chaos! event, Jack O'Lantern launched a scheme to bring about a hell on Earth and take over the world with the proper alignment of cosmos. Raising dead persons and animating dinosaurs, he looked to gather the remaining heroes of the world for the purpose of eliminating them. However, Brother Voodoo (Jericho Drumm) and the Supernaturals were able to overcome his machinations, sending Jack into another dimension. With Jack gone, his minions disappeared and the world was saved. Jack O'Lantern may still be holding the heroes captured from the first Chaos! event in his wand and plotting another takeover of the Earth.

JLA/Avengers
Jack O'Lantern is among the enthralled villains defending Krona's stronghold when the heroes assault it. Tasmanian Devil is shown pushing some rocks onto him.

Spider-Geddon
In the Spider-Geddon event on Earth-11580, a version of Jack O'Lantern is seen alongside the Green Goblin, Hobgoblin and Demogoblin during the Goblin Night. Under the orders of the Goblin Queen, they try to kill Gwen Stacy, but Spiders-Man arrives and defeats the Goblins.

In other media

Television
 An unidentified incarnation of Jack O'Lantern appears in the Ultimate Spider-Man episode "Halloween Night at the Museum". This version is the result of Morgan le Fay magically placing a jack-o'-lantern on the head of an unnamed security guard (voiced by Drake Bell) to bring about the end of the world. Jack O'Lantern attacks Spider-Man, but once Morgan le Fay is defeated, the security guard is turned back to normal.
 The unidentified fifth incarnation of Jack O'Lantern appears in the Spider-Man (2017) episode "Bring On the Bad Guys" Pt. 3, voiced by Booboo Stewart. This version is obsessed with Halloween, to the point where he claims every day is Halloween.

Video games
 The Jason Macendale incarnation of Jack O'Lantern appears as a mini-boss in Spider-Man (1995).
 The Steven Levins incarnation of Jack O'Lantern makes a cameo appearance in Marvel: Ultimate Alliance 2.
 The fourth incarnation of Jack O'Lantern appears as a boss in Marvel: Avengers Alliance.
 The Jason Macendale incarnation of Jack O'Lantern appears as a boss in Spider-Man Unlimited, voiced by Travis Willingham.
 The fourth incarnation of Jack O'Lantern appears in Marvel Avengers Academy, voiced by Matthew Curtis.
 The Jason Macendale incarnation of Jack O'Lantern appears as an enhanced costume for the Green Goblin in Marvel Heroes.

Merchandise
The demonic version of Jason Macendale appears in the Spider-Man Classics line, which was later reworked for Marvel Legends' "Sinister Six" set and repainted as a Demogoblin figure.

References

External links
 Jason Macendale Jr. (Earth-616) at Marvel Wiki
 
 
 Hobgoblin (Jason Macendale) at Marvel.com
 Jack O'Lantern (Steven Levins) at Marvel.com
 Jack O'Lantern (Maguire Beck) at Marvel.com
 Grand Comics Database
 Profile of Jack O'Lantern (Jason Macendale) at Spiderfan.org
 Hobgoblin IV (Jason Macendale)  at SpiderFan.org
 Profile of Jack O'Lantern (Steven Levins) at Spiderfan.org
 Profile of Jack O'Lantern (Daniel Berkhart) at Spiderfan.org
 Profile of Jack O'Lantern (Maguire Beck) at Spiderfan.org
 
 
 

Articles about multiple fictional characters
Characters created by Gerry Conway
Characters created by Mark Gruenwald
Characters created by Rick Remender
Characters created by Ross Andru
Characters created by Steve Ditko
Characters created by Tom DeFalco
Comics characters introduced in 1981
Comics characters introduced in 1992
Comics characters introduced in 1996
Comics characters introduced in 2009
Comics characters introduced in 2011
Fictional assassins in comics
Fictional Central Intelligence Agency personnel
Fictional mercenaries in comics
Fictional terrorists
Marvel Comics female supervillains
Marvel Comics male supervillains
Marvel Comics supervillains
Spider-Man characters code names
Spider-Man characters